Belfast North is a parliamentary constituency in the United Kingdom House of Commons. The current MP is John Finucane of Sinn Féin.

Boundaries

1885–1918: In the Borough of Belfast, that part of Dock ward bounded on the south-east by a line drawn along the centre of North Queen Street, on the north-east by a line drawn along the centre of New Lodge Road, on the south-west by a line drawn along the centre of Limestone Road and York Road, and on the east by a line drawn along the centre of Carrickfergus Road, and that part of St. Anne's ward not in the constituency of Belfast West, and the townlands of Ballygomartin, Ballysillan Lower, Greencastle, Legoniel, Lowwood, Old Park and Skegoneill in the parish of Shankill, along with that part of the townland of Ballyaghagan within the parliamentary borough.

1922–1974: The County Borough of Belfast wards of Clifton, Duncairn, and Shankill.

1974–1983: The County Borough of Belfast wards of Clifton, Dock, Duncairn, and Shankill.

1983–1997: The District of Belfast wards of Ardoyne, Ballysillan, Bellevue, Castleview, Cavehill, Cliftonville, Crumlin, Duncairn, Fortwilliam, Grove, Legoniel, New Lodge, Shankill, and Woodvale.

1997–2010: The District of Belfast wards of Ardoyne, Ballysillan, Bellevue, Castleview, Cavehill, Chichester Park, Cliftonville, Crumlin, Duncairn, Fortwilliam, Legoniel, New Lodge, Water Works, and Woodvale, and the District of Newtownabbey wards of Abbey, Coole, Dunanney, Valley, and Whitehouse.

2010–present: The District of Belfast wards of Ardoyne, Ballysillan, Bellevue, Castleview, Cavehill, Chichester Park, Cliftonville, Crumlin, Duncairn, Fortwilliam, Legoniel, New Lodge, Water Works, and Woodvale, and the District of Newtownabbey wards of Abbey, Ballyhenry, Cloughfern, Collinbridge, Coole, Dunanney, Glebe, Glengormley, Hightown, Valley, and Whitehouse.

The seat was recreated in 1922 when, as part of the establishment of the devolved Stormont Parliament for Northern Ireland, the number of MPs in the Westminster Parliament was drastically cut. The seat is centred on the north section of Belfast, though at times the area around the Docks on the north side of the Lagan Estuary has instead been part of variously Belfast East and Belfast West. Belfast North also contains part of the district of Newtownabbey.

Belfast North contains 14 wards of Belfast City Council and 5 of Newtownabbey Borough Council.  The constituency suffered the highest level of violence in Northern Ireland during The Troubles and covers many areas synonymous with the conflict – the New Lodge, Ardoyne, Rathcoole, Ballysillan and Woodvale.  The overall tenor of the constituency is working-class, with a high proportion of residents in public housing, and concentrations of low-income single people in the middle Antrim Road and Cliftonville areas.  There are some upscale residential areas around Belfast Castle and on the slopes of Cavehill.  Sectarian divisions are stark, with a number of Peace lines cutting through the constituency and occasional outbursts of sectarian street violence, and was the focus for post-ceasefire incidents such as the Holy Cross dispute.

At the boundary commission hearings in September 2005 prior to the 2010 general election, the SDLP proposed extending the seat to Cloughfern and Jordanstown. The DUP supported the addition of Cloughfern. Sinn Féin were generally supportive of the commission's proposals.

Following the revised recommendations, the Commission proposals were finalised and accepted by Parliament through the Northern Ireland Parliamentary Constituencies Order.

History
Belfast North is a constituency with a nationalist majority. Belfast North historically had a narrow unionist majority, which gradually decreased over time. The nationalist vote is considerable, and those from a Catholic background (47%) now slightly outnumber those from a Protestant background (46%), according to the 2011 census. It has generated particular interest for a number of highly unusual election results, as well as for several candidates and MPs prominently disagreeing with their parties.

Of the five main political parties in Northern Ireland, four (the Ulster Unionist Party, the Democratic Unionist Party, the Social Democratic and Labour Party, and Sinn Féin) all have relatively strong support bases and routinely poll similar results. Other parties such as the Alliance, Progressive Unionist Party, Unionist Party of Northern Ireland, Conservatives and the Workers' Party have at times polled significantly, as have independent candidates, with the result that many elections have been won on comparatively low shares of the vote. The elections to the various assemblies have often seen the seats for the constituency heavily split – in 1998 no party won more than one Assembly seat.

The area saw a steady out movement of Protestants during the Troubles, to some degree replaced by a growing Catholic population, although the overall population of the area fell sharply. However, all the inner-city communities in the constituency are now haemorrhaging electors, and the overall ethnic composition of the constituency now seems stable.

The seat was consistently held by the Ulster Unionist Party from its creation until the 1970s. In 1972 the first notable dissent occurred when the sitting MP, Stratton Mills, dissented from the UUP's decision to withdraw from the Conservative whip at Westminster over the suspension of the Stormont Parliament. Mills remained as a Conservative MP, but the following year he joined the Alliance, giving them their only Westminster representation before 2010.

In the February 1974 general election the seat was won by John Carson of the Ulster Unionist Party with backing by the Vanguard Progressive Unionist Party and the Democratic Unionist Party on a united slate in opposition to the Sunningdale Agreement. Carson's victory came despite a majority of votes being cast for pro-Sunningdale candidates, albeit split between the Pro-Assembly Unionists, the Social Democratic and Labour Party and the Northern Ireland Labour Party. Carson held his seat in the October 1974 election but was deselected by the local Ulster Unionists over his support for the minority Labour government.

The 1979 general election saw one of the most dramatic results of all when Johnny McQuade of the Democratic Unionist Party won the seat with a mere 27.6% of the vote – the third lowest total for a successful candidate in a UK general election in the twentieth century. This came about due to the strong showing of several other parties, dividing the vote strongly. McQuade also had the distinction of being the oldest person to be initially elected to Westminster in the 20th century and did not stand at the next general election.

In 1983, Cecil Walker regained the seat for the UUP, beating Scotsman George Seawright of the DUP. In the 1987 general election the UUP and DUP agreed a pact in opposition to the Anglo Irish Agreement. Seawright had been expelled from the DUP and stood in the election, reviving the Protestant Unionist Party label, but was unsuccessful.

Walker continued to hold the seat until 2001 but gained a reputation for inactivity. In the 2001 general election the DUP contested the seat for the first time since 1983, with their candidate Nigel Dodds campaigning heavily on both their opposition to the Good Friday Agreement and Walker's record. Walker also suffered from a disastrous television interview during the campaign. In the election Walker's vote collapsed to a mere 12%, coming fourth whilst Dodds won the seat. The UUP vote fell even further in both the 2003 Assembly election and the 2005 general election.

Nigel Dodds became the DUP's deputy leader and Commons leader in 2008, but the 2010 general election saw Sinn Féin increase their vote share and reduce the DUP majority. Sinn Féin targeted the seat in the 2015 general election, campaigning on returning the constituency's first Irish nationalist MP and the growing Catholic population surpassing Protestants. However, the DUP and the UUP agreed an electoral pact in which the UUP would withdraw their candidate to help re-elect an unionist. This allowed for Dodds to hold the seat comfortably with an increased majority, although a 4.3% swing to Sinn Féin in the 2017 general election still confirmed the seat's marginal status.

Prior to the 2019 general election, the SDLP and UUP withdrew their candidates. In a highly divisive contest marred by threats from loyalist paramilitaries, John Finucane of Sinn Féin won with a majority of 1,943 votes. This meant that the 2019 election was the first time that Sinn Féin won multiple seats in Belfast and the first time Belfast North had elected a nationalist instead of a unionist. Dodds was replaced as Commons leader by Jeffrey Donaldson.

Members of Parliament 
The Member of Parliament since the 2019 general election has been John Finucane of Sinn Féin. He defeated Nigel Dodds of the Democratic Unionist Party, who had sat for the seat since 2001.

Elections

Elections in the 2010s 

This seat saw the only increase in vote share for Sinn Féin at the 2019 general election.

Elections in the 2000s

Elections in the 1990s

1997 changes are compared to the 1992 notional results shown below.

Elections in the 1980s

Elections in the 1970s

Elections in the 1960s

Elections in the 1950s

Elections in the 1940s

Elections in the 1930s

Elections in the 1920s

Elections in the 1910s

Elections in the 1900s

Elections in the 1890s

Elections in the 1880s

See also 
 List of parliamentary constituencies in Northern Ireland

References

External links 
Politics Resources (Election results from 1922 onwards)
Electoral Calculus (Election results from 1955 onwards)
2017 Election House of Commons Library 2017 Election report
A Vision Of Britain Through Time (Constituency elector numbers)
BBC News, Election 2005
BBC News, Vote 2001
Guardian Unlimited Politics

Election results from 1951 to the present , at psr.keele.ac.uk
F. W. S. Craig, British Parliamentary Election Results 1918 – 1949
F. W. S. Craig, British Parliamentary Election Results 1950 – 1970
The Constitutional Year Book For 1912, Conservative Central Office

Westminster Parliamentary constituencies in Belfast
Westminster Parliamentary constituencies in Northern Ireland
Constituencies of the Parliament of the United Kingdom established in 1885
Constituencies of the Parliament of the United Kingdom disestablished in 1918
Constituencies of the Parliament of the United Kingdom established in 1922